Our Lady of Good Counsel Parish is a Roman Catholic church in Bridgeport, Connecticut, part of the  Diocese of Bridgeport.

History 
The church was dedicated October 8, 1950 by the Most Reverend Henry J. O'brien, Bishop of Hartford.  The Chapel was designed by Andrew G. Patrick and built by E&F Construction Co.  The church was dedicated before more than 800 who gathered to witness the ceremonies.  Erected as a mission of St. Patrick Church, the Chapel is located at the corner of Ortega and Funston Avenues in Bridgeport.

References

External links 
 Our Lady of Good Counsel - Diocesan information
 Our Lady of Good Counsel Chapel - Website

Roman Catholic churches completed in 1940
Our Lady of Good Counsel
Roman Catholic Diocese of Bridgeport
1940 establishments in Connecticut
20th-century Roman Catholic church buildings in the United States